The Tuskegee Golden Tigers football program is the intercollegiate American football team for the Tuskegee University located in the U.S. state of Alabama. The team competes in the NCAA Division II level and are members of the Southern Intercollegiate Athletic Conference. The school's first football team was fielded in 1913. The team plays its home games at the 10,000 seat Abbott Memorial Alumni Stadium. They are coached by Willie Slater.

Notable former players
Notable alumni include:
 Drayton Florence NFL 11 seasons
 Ken Woodard NFL 8 seasons
 Anthony Mitchell NFL 8 seasons
 Ricky Jones NFL 7 seasons
 Cecil Leonard NFL 2 seasons
 Dennis Norfleet
 Frank Walker NFL 9 seasons

There have been years where a pair of Tuskegee players were drafted in the same year (1967,1970,1972,2002), but no year was like 1969. In that year, five different players from Tuskegee University were selected in the NFL Draft. It started with George Irby going 195th overall to the New York Giants in the eighth round, followed by Cecil Leonard just 13 picks later at 208th overall to the New York Jets in the eighth round. The Golden Tigers had to wait seven rounds before their next pick as Fritz Latham was selected 383rd overall by the St. Louis Cardinals, while in the 16th round, James Lowe was selected by the Cleveland Browns with the 410th overall pick. The final pick of the year for Tuskegee came in the 17th round as Ralph Jenkins was selected by the Kansas City Chiefs with the 438th overall pick.

All-Time NFL Draft at Tuskegee

Championships 
Black college football national championship - 1924, 1925, 1926, 1927, 1929, 1930, 2000, 2007, 2015, 2017

Pioneer Bowl Championships 
Pioneer Bowl - 2009, 2007, 2006, 2005, 2001, 2000, 1998

Lost 2012, 2004 and 1999

NCAA Division II Football Playoffs 
NCAA Division II Football Championship - 4 appearances

2016 (lost round 2), 2015 (lost round 3), 2014 (lost round 2), 2013 (lost round 1)

References

External links
 

 
American football teams established in 1913
1913 establishments in Alabama